Al-Sinaa Stadium is a multi-use stadium in Baghdad, Iraq. It is currently used mostly for football matches and is the home stadium of Al-Sinaa SC. The stadium holds up to 6,000 people.

The stadium hosted the 2017 Iraq FA Cup Final on 22August 2017 between Al-Zawraa and Naft Al-Wasat. Al-Zawraa won the match 1–0 with a stoppage time goal from Alaa Abdul-Zahra, for the club's record 15th title.

See also 
List of football stadiums in Iraq
2017 Iraq FA Cup Final

References

Football venues in Iraq
Multi-purpose stadiums in Iraq
Athletics (track and field) venues in Iraq
Buildings and structures in Baghdad
Sport in Baghdad